Jussandro Pimenta Matos (born 11 March 1992), simply Jussandro, is a Brazilian footballer who plays for Rio Claro as a left back.

Career
Born in Irecê, Jussandro graduated from Bahia's youth setup, and made his first-team debut on 26 August 2012, starting and playing 60 minutes in a 1–1 home draw against Atlético Goianiense, for the Campeonato Brasileiro Série A championship. After appearing regularly during the 2012 and 2013 campaigns, he was left out of the squad in March 2014.

On 18 June 2014 Jussandro joined Portuguesa, after rescinding his link with Bahia. However, after appearing sparingly he again rescinded his deal, and moved to top-divisioner Chapecoense on 23 September.

Honours
Campeonato Baiano: 2012, 2014

References

External links
Bahia official profile 
Jussandro at playmakerstats.com (English version of ogol.com.br)

1992 births
Living people
Sportspeople from Bahia
Brazilian footballers
Association football defenders
Campeonato Brasileiro Série A players
Esporte Clube Bahia players
Associação Portuguesa de Desportos players
Associação Chapecoense de Futebol players
ABC Futebol Clube players
Botafogo Futebol Clube (SP) players
Clube do Remo players
Batatais Futebol Clube players
Clube Atlético Penapolense players
Rio Claro Futebol Clube players